Kunat is a locality in Victoria, Australia, located approximately 28 km from Swan Hill, Victoria.

Kunat Post Office opened on 14 July 1900 and closed in 1949.

References

Towns in Victoria (Australia)
Rural City of Swan Hill